The Old Nick Company, established in 1948, is the main student theatre company at the University of Tasmania. It stages a popular annual revue and other smaller productions. Past members include actor Essie Davis, Charles Wooley from the Australian 60 Minutes, journalist Helene Chung Martin, and theatre director Roger Hodgman.

External links 

 http://www.oldnick.org.au/

Amateur theatre companies in Australia
Organisations based in Tasmania